Sitabuldi is a metro station in the Sitabuldi neighbourhood of Nagpur, Maharashtra. Sitabuldi serves as the interchange station allowing passengers to transfer between the Orange Line and the Aqua Line of the Nagpur Metro. It was opened to the public on 8 March 2019. Aqua Line services commenced on 28 January 2020. The station covers a total area of 250,000 square feet.

Sitabuldi is central location of Nagpur, the Intra City bus stop is located near to metro station, while the Inter City bus stand at Ganeshpeth can be reached by autorikshaw or local bus.

Design
The Nagpur Metro Rail Corporation (now Mahametro) launched a global competition on 5 June 2015 inviting bids for the Sitaburdi and Zero Mile metro stations. Twenty-three architecture firms submitted designs in response. The metro authority shortlisted 13 firms for the detailed design stage, and eventually requested four firms to submit designs. A panel of architects appointed by the authority to pick the winning design, and the preliminary design of the winning entry was unveiled by the metro authority in May 2016.

The station was designed by a consortium of architects comprising Enia Architects, Mahendra Raj Consultants and Worxpace Consulting. The building's facade is made of locally sourced glass and stone.The station is a T-shaped building. A three-storey building is located at the center of the "T" and six-storey building one of its arms facing Rani Jhansi Square. An art installation called the Crown of Nagpur was installed on top of the six-storey building. The Crown of Nagpur has a base shaped like an inverted flower with a crown over it and a transparent dome below the crown. The structure is 14 metres high, 35 metres long and 25 metres wide. The inverted flower is composed of steel and polycarbonate, and the dome is made of polycarbonate. The polycarbonate sheets are lit with blue lights. The Crown of Nagpur also includes a 2 metre long, 360° LED display intended to display advertisements. Mahametro also plans to open a restaurant on the terrace of the station which would provide visitors with a view of the Crown of Nagpur.

The Solar Energy Corporation of India (SECI) and Mahametro began installing a 200 KW rooftop solar plant at the station in mid-2020 and completed work in December 2020. The plant will power the station's power needs for lighting fixtures, air conditioners, escalators and elevators.

Station Layout

References

Nagpur Metro stations
Railway stations in India opened in 2019